Ftireh  is a Syrian village located in Kafr Nabl Nahiyah in Maarrat al-Nu'man District, Idlib.  According to the Syria Central Bureau of Statistics (CBS), Ftireh had a population of 2715 in the 2004 census.

Syrian Civil War

On 16 June 2022, a fighter of Tahrir al-Sham was shot dead by forces of the Syrian Army on the frontline near the village.

References 

Populated places in Maarat al-Numan District